Borowina may refer to the following places:
Borowina, Biłgoraj County in Lublin Voivodeship (east Poland)
Borowina, Łuków County in Lublin Voivodeship (east Poland)
Borowina, Puławy County in Lublin Voivodeship (east Poland)
Borowina, Zamość County in Lublin Voivodeship (east Poland)
Borowina, Subcarpathian Voivodeship (south-east Poland)
Borowina, Grójec County in Masovian Voivodeship (east-central Poland)
Borowina, Piaseczno County in Masovian Voivodeship (east-central Poland)
Borowina, Lubusz Voivodeship (west Poland)
Borowina, Pomeranian Voivodeship (north Poland)